Roger Dodger is a 2002 American comedy-drama written and directed by Dylan Kidd. It stars Campbell Scott, Jesse Eisenberg (in his feature film debut), Isabella Rossellini, Elizabeth Berkley and Jennifer Beals. The film follows Roger Swanson, a womanizing ad executive who takes his nephew Nick out for a night in the city after the young man asks him for advice on experience with women.

The film debuted at the inaugural Tribeca Festival to critical acclaim and won the award for Best Narrative Feature for Kidd. It went on to win the FIRESCI Prize and award for Best Debut Film at the Venice Film Festival. Roger Dodger was given a limited release by Artisan Entertainment on October 25, 2002. Both Scott and Eisenberg received awards notices, with Scott winning a National Board of Review Award for Best Male Lead and Eisenberg earning a Gotham Award nomination for Breakthrough Actor.

Plot
After cynical New York City advertising copywriter Roger Swanson is dumped by his on-again/off-again girlfriend, Joyce, who is also his boss. His painful workday is further complicated by the unexpected arrival of his 16-year-old nephew, Nick. After asking to spend the night at Roger's, Nick reveals that he has come to ask for help in hopes of ditching his virginal status, Nick begs Roger for a lesson in the art of seduction. Embittered Roger then takes on the role of a nocturnal drill sergeant in an imaginary war between the sexes, starting Nick's training at an upscale singles bar. There they meet two beautiful women who turn out to be less malleable than Roger expects.

Although this first attempt to seduce women is unsuccessful, Nick chooses to continue the quest, which takes them to a party at Joyce's. There they find Joyce's secretary drunk and consider taking advantage of her vulnerable state. Once in the bedroom, Nick's conscience gets the better of him and he allows her to fall asleep untouched.

With Roger spinning out of control and Nick's window of opportunity closing rapidly, they agree to go with the "Fail Safe" plan. This turns out to be an underground brothel. At the underground location Roger finds he cannot let Nick lose his virginity in such an emotionally barren atmosphere, and drags him back to his apartment to sleep things off. The following day, Roger hears his sister's message from his answering machine saying that no one has seen her son Nick for two days, so Roger tells Nick to call Nick's mom. Nick travels back to Ohio, but a while later, Roger shows up unexpectedly to tutor Nick and his classmates on their home turf, bonding with the younger men in a more potent way in an atmosphere populated by adolescent peers.

At the closing, it is left open which way Nick will go.

Cast
 Campbell Scott as Roger Swanson
 Jesse Eisenberg as Nick
 Isabella Rossellini as Joyce
 Elizabeth Berkley as Andrea
 Jennifer Beals as Sophie
 Ben Shenkman as Donovan
 Mina Badie as Donna
 Chris Stack as Chris

Production 
Dylan Kidd said his idea for the film "started with the idea of a guy who feels like he can tell everyone else what they're thinking. It was based on a friend of mine, who in college had this strange ability to go up to strangers and take their psychology apart in minute detail. It struck me as disturbing but also very compelling." Kidd decided to make the lead character work in advertising because Roger "actually ends up bringing that kind of rhetoric into the singles arena. The idea that he's literally trying to sell himself as a product, by creating insecurity in other people."

Campbell Scott was cast when the director happened to bump into him at a New York café. Jesse Eisenberg won the role of Nick when he was still a senior in high school. 

The film was shot on 35mm.

Reception

Release 
The film had its world premiere at the first annual Tribeca Festival on May 9, 2002. It also opened the San Diego Film Festival on September 18, 2002. Artisan Entertainment acquired North American distribution rights to the film and gave it a limited theatrical release on October 25, 2002.

Critical reception 
Rotten Tomatoes gives the film 88% based on 123 reviews. The site's consensus states: "The movie could have benefited from a more experienced director, but a great cast and script overcome any first time jitters the director may have had." On Metacritic, the film has an average score of 75 out of 100, based on 33 reviews.

The film was seen as a breakthrough for Jesse Eisenberg, who was widely acclaimed for his role. Stephen Holden of The New York Times called Roger Dodger a "promising first feature" from writer-director Dylan Kidd. He praised the performances of Scott and Eisenberg, the latter of whom he wrote, "The young actor's portrayal of an innocent but adventurous high school student finds a lovely balance between crude adolescent avidity and an inner sweetness that contradicts everything Roger stands for. It is this sweetness that wins over the women they meet and earns Nick his first serious kiss." Holden concluded "the movie, unlike its title character, treats women with respect."

Roger Ebert also gave the film a positive review, awarding it three out of four stars. However, he pointed out that the young age of Nick shows there is a double standard in films when it comes to the issue of consent and sex. He added the film "effectively deflects criticism in this area by making Roger the victim and the subject. While Nick is funny and earnest, and generates many laughs, the movie is really about Roger--about his attempts to tutor his nephew in a lifestyle that has left the older man lonely and single. The film is not just a lot of one-liners but has a buried agenda, as the funny early dialogue slides down into confusion and sadness. There is a lesson here for Nick, but not the one Roger is teaching."

Accolades

References

External links
 
 
 
 
 

2002 films
2000s coming-of-age comedy-drama films
2000s sex comedy films
American coming-of-age comedy-drama films
American sex comedy films
2000s English-language films
Films set in New York City
Films shot in New York City
American independent films
2002 independent films
Artisan Entertainment films
2002 comedy films
2002 drama films
2002 directorial debut films
2000s American films